Edasseri Award is an Indian literary award given to outstanding literary works produced in Malayalam language. The award was instituted in 1982 by Edasseri Smaraka Samithi in memory of Malayalam poet Edasseri Govindan Nair. Each year a separate branch of literature, like poetry, novel, short-story etc., is considered for the award. A short-list is prepared after a preliminary scrutiny of the manuscripts and/or printed books received for consideration, and a three-member jury decides the work for award out of this short-listed selection.

Recipients

References

External links
 Edasseri Smaraka Samithi

Indian literary awards
Awards established in 1982
Malayalam literary awards
1982 establishments in Kerala